Stilbum is a genus of fungi in the family Chionosphaeraceae. The genus was circumscribed by German mycologist Heinrich Julius Tode in 1790, with Stilbum vulgare as the type species.

Species

Stilbum anomalum 
Stilbum bicolor 
Stilbum buloloense 
Stilbum fasciculatum 
Stilbum haustellare 
Stilbum heveae 
Stilbum leiopus 
Stilbum melleum 
Stilbum mycetophilum 
Stilbum nigripes 
Stilbum piliforme 
Stilbum sphaerocephalum 
Stilbum stevensonii 
Stilbum torrendianum 
Stilbum turbinatum 
Stilbum vaporarium 
Stilbum vulgare

References

Agaricostilbales
Basidiomycota genera
Taxa described in 1790